Copiah Creek is a stream in the U.S. state of Mississippi. It is a tributary to the Pearl River.

Copiah is a name derived from the Choctaw language meaning "“screaming panther".

References

Rivers of Mississippi
Rivers of Copiah County, Mississippi
Tributaries of the Pearl River (Mississippi–Louisiana)
Mississippi placenames of Native American origin